Joe Hogan may refer to:
 Joe Hogan (footballer, born 1875) (1875–1943), Australian rules footballer for St Kilda
 Joe Hogan (footballer, born 1909) (1909–1993), Australian rules footballer for Melbourne
 Joe Hogan (footballer, born 1938), Scottish footballer for Partick Thistle
 Joe Hogan (Pennsylvania politician), American politician and member of the Pennsylvania House of Representatives

See also
 Joseph Hogan (1937–2014), American politician and member of the Nevada Assembly
 Joseph Lloyd Hogan (1916–2000), Roman Catholic bishop